Bad Boy is the seventh studio album by Ringo Starr, released in 1978 during a period where his musical career was sliding into freefall after several years of solo success. Although Bad Boy was meant to reverse this trend, Starr's success dwindled further.

Background and recording
After the critical and commercial disaster of Ringo the 4th (1977), Starr and his musical partner, Vini Poncia, decided to create a less campy album and streamline the sound to lose the disco qualities and excesses that marred the previous release. With Poncia taking the production reins, Starr mostly relies on other people's songs, with no celebrity guests to be found. In November 1977, the album was recorded, for tax purposes, at Can-Base Studio in Vancouver, Toronto, and Elite Recording Studio in The Bahamas. It was completed within ten days of sessions in November 1977, with the exception of some orchestral overdubs done on 8 March 1978 under the direction of James Newton Howard.

Release and reception

Bad Boy was released on 21 April 1978 in the UK, while in the US it was released on 16 June. Bad Boy reached only number 129 in the US, despite the airing of a prime time TV special entitled Ringo, on 26 April. The special was recorded for 10 days from 11 February in Hollywood. The special had an airing in the UK on 2 January 1983. The album's inner sleeve featured photographs by his then-fiancée Nancy Andrews. From the album, Starr played "Heart on My Sleeve", "Hard Times" and "A Man Like Me" on the TV special. Polydor, after three consecutive non-charters in the UK, promptly dropped Starr, while his new US label, Portrait (who picked him up after Atlantic had dropped him) would eventually cancel his contract in 1981 during the making of his next album (Stop and Smell the Roses).

"Lipstick Traces (On a Cigarette)" was released as a single by Portrait on 18 April 1978 in the US, backed with "Old Time Relovin'" as the B-side, preceding the album in the US. A planned release of the single in the UK, for issue in June by Polydor, was shelved. "Heart on My Sleeve" was released, backed with "Who Needs a Heart", as a single in the US on 6 July. Out of the singles released from Bad Boy, neither "Lipstick Traces (On a Cigarette)" nor "Heart on My Sleeve" charted. In the UK, the lone single was "Tonight", backed with "Heart on My Sleeve", on 21 July and that failed to chart. On the same day, production began on another special to promote the album, directed by Christian Topps, but the special was never completed. "A Man Like Me" is simply Scouse the Mouse's "A Mouse Like Me" with all the words "Mouse" substituted by "Man". Bad Boy was reissued on CD in the US by Epic on 26 March 1991.

Track listing

Personnel
Ringo Starr – lead vocals, drums
Lon Van Eaton – lead guitar
Jimmy Webb –  rhythm guitar
Dr. John – keyboards
Dee Murray – bass guitar
Vini Poncia – backing vocals, arrangements
Hamisch Bissonnette - synthesizers
Doug Riley - string arrangements, conductor
Tom Scott - horn arrangements 
Featuring Vini Poncia's Peaking Duck Orchestra and Chorus
Technical
Richard Starkey - associate producer
Anne Streer - production coordination 
Bob Schaper - engineer
Nancy Lee Andrews - cover photography

Charts

References
Footnotes

Citations

External links

1978 albums
Ringo Starr albums
Polydor Records albums
Albums produced by Vini Poncia